James Macnaughton MacGregor (6 January 1829 – 8 October 1894) was a Scottish and New Zealand Presbyterian minister and theologian. He was born in Callander, Perthshire, Scotland on 6 January 1829.  (Callander is now in the Stirling council area.)

Service in Scotland
After serving in Barry (1856–1861) and Paisley (1861–1868) as a minister in the Free Church of Scotland, he was elected and succeeded Professor James Buchanan as the Chair of Systematic Theology at New College, Edinburgh.

With family to New Zealand
In 1881, MacGregor and his family migrated to New Zealand after 13 years in that chair in Edinburgh. He carried on his ministry in Oamaru until he died there in 1894.
A son, William Cunningham MacGregor (1862–1934), became solicitor-general in 1920.

References

External links

Death registration index, including the middle name

1829 births
1894 deaths
New Zealand theologians
New Zealand Presbyterians
People from Perthshire
People from Oamaru
Scottish emigrants to New Zealand